Albert Einstein Academy Charter School is an IB Primary Years Programme-certified charter school in San Diego, California, United States. It is a part of the San Diego Unified School District. Established in 2002, it is the only school in the district authorized as an IB-PYP school. The school serves grades kindergarten through 8th grade. It is actually chartered as two schools: an elementary school (K-5) of about 826 students and a middle school (6-8) of about 596 students. It is accredited by the Western Association of Schools and Colleges.

The school teaches via a language immersion program in which classes are taught partly in English and partly in German. Spanish was later added to the mix. The German-English immersion program has attracted visits from members of the German Parliament.

As with all charter schools in San Diego, the school is free; admission is by application and a lottery. Originally, preference was given to students who speak German. However, that policy was challenged by the school board as possibly discriminatory and is no longer in place.

References

 http://aeacms.org/wp-content/uploads/2014/05/AEA_SDDT_051414.pdf
 http://www.cbs8.com/story/26389003/new-charter-school-will-serve-500-students

External links
 Middle School website
 Elementary School website

Schools in San Diego
Public elementary schools in California
Public middle schools in California
International Baccalaureate schools in California
2002 establishments in California